Fabio Ferraro (born 2 September 2002) is a Belgian professional footballer who plays as a forward for RWDM.

Club career
Ferrarro is a youth product of the academies of Mons, Royal Excel Mouscron, Tubize-Braine and Charleroi. He made his professional debut with Charleroi in a 3–1 Belgian First Division A loss to Seraing on 22 October 2021.

On 17 July 2022, Ferraro signed a two-year contract with RWDM.

References

External links

ACFF Profile

2002 births
Living people
People from Halle, Belgium
Belgian footballers
Belgian people of Italian descent
Association football forwards
R. Charleroi S.C. players
RWDM47 players
Belgian Pro League players
Challenger Pro League players
Footballers from Flemish Brabant